This is a summary of the electoral history of Saeed Jalili, an Iranian Principlist politician who was Secretary of the Supreme National Security Council (2007–2013).

Parliamentary elections

2004 

He ran from Mashhad and lost.

2008 

He ran from Mashhad and lost.

Presidential election

2013 

Jalili finished third with 4,168,946 votes (11.36%).

References 

Electoral history of Iranian politicians